The North American Qualification Tournament for the 2020 Men's Olympic Volleyball Tournament was a volleyball tournament for men's national teams held in Vancouver, Canada from 10 to 12 January 2020. Four teams played in the tournament and the winners Canada qualified for the 2020 Summer Olympics.

Qualification
The 2019 NORCECA Champions Cup champions which had not yet qualified to the 2020 Summer Olympics and the top three teams from the 2019 NORCECA Championship which had not yet qualified to the 2020 Summer Olympics or the tournament qualified for the tournament. Final standings of the 2019 NORCECA Champions Cup or 2019 NORCECA Championship are shown in brackets.

 (2019 NORCECA Champions Cup Champions)
 (2019 NORCECA Championship 3rd place)
 (2019 NORCECA Championship 4th place)
 (2019 NORCECA Championship 5th place)

Venue

Pool standing procedure
 Number of matches won
 Match points
 Points ratio
 Sets ratio
 Result of the last match between the tied teams

Match won 3–0: 5 match points for the winner, 0 match points for the loser
Match won 3–1: 4 match points for the winner, 1 match point for the loser
Match won 3–2: 3 match points for the winner, 2 match points for the loser

Round robin
All times are Pacific Standard Time (UTC−08:00).

Final standing

Qualifying team for Summer Olympics

Awards

Most Valuable Player
 Blair Bann
Best Scorer
 Stephen Maar
Best Server
 Miguel Ángel López
Best Digger
 Jesús Rangel
Best Receiver
 Blair Bann
Best Setter
 Jay Blankenau
Best Outside Spikers
 Stephen Maar
 John Gordon Perrin
Best Middle Blockers
 Arthur Szwarc
 Liván Osoria
Best Opposite Spiker
 Maurice Torres
Best Libero
 Arnel Cabrera

See also
Volleyball at the 2020 Summer Olympics – Women's North American qualification

References

External links
Official website – FIVB
Official website – NORCECA
Regulations
Final Standing
Awards

2020 in volleyball
Volleyball qualification for the 2020 Summer Olympics
2020 in Canadian sports
Sports competitions in Vancouver
International volleyball competitions hosted by Canada
January 2020 sports events in Canada